Ernest Goes to School is a 1994 American comedy film written and directed by Coke Sams and starring Jim Varney. It is the seventh film to feature the character Ernest P. Worrell and the final to be released theatrically, although it only opened in a few cities.  This is the only Ernest film not to be directed by John R. Cherry III. This was Will Sasso's feature film debut. Its opening theme is "Hail to the Muskrats!" which was the alma mater.  The film received a limited theatrical release in Cincinnati, Ohio and Louisville, Kentucky beginning on June 10, 1994. The film was released on video on December 14, 1994.

It is the second "Ernest" movie to be filmed in Vancouver, British Columbia, Canada.

Plot
Ernest (Jim Varney) works as a janitor at Chickasaw Falls High School, which is facing closure due to the school board's decision to merge other schools in the area. There is also a new rule: All employees are required to have a high school diploma, which Ernest lacks due to an incomplete high school transcript. Ernest has two choices as a result: Resign or go through the twelfth grade. Ernest reluctantly decides to redo school and enters the student body, attending regular classes and performing usual student activities, but all not with a little catastrophe or predicament or distraction.

Soon, the principal tells him he is failing and that he may as well forget about the experiment. As Ernest is off sulking about it, two science teachers show up in his locker to reveal their biggest experiment to him - a potential brain accelerator, and they make Ernest their "Human Guinea Pig". The experiment is successful and Ernest becomes significantly smart. He is extremely proficient at virtually everything from mathematics to drama to music. The only downside is that his personality turns snobbish and superior, alienating him from his friends. He impresses his teachers and it seems he is well on the way to graduating with top marks. While Ernest is doing well, Ms. Flugal, who is Ernest's love interest, makes him band conductor and puts him in charge of directing the marching band in preparation for the halftime show during the football game. Ernest diligently does so and instructs the whole band to watch him if anything wrong happens. This rule is very instrumental in the ending result.

Eventually, two bullies find out about Ernest's secret by watching him descend into his locker to recharge his intelligence. They in turn destroy the accelerator right before the night of the football game. The whole procession is ultimately ruined when Ernest realizes he cannot recharge and has to direct the band with his usual mind and intelligence. He spends the whole disastrous affair with his head inserted in a tuba which resulted after he descended toward the band from the podium in his clumsiness. He in turn disappoints the band, the audience who had to run from the resulting fire, the principal, and most of all, Ms. Flugal.

Depressed, with the knowledge that he cannot recharge his head anymore, Ernest starts packing his things until he finds three of his friends mocking him. They force Ernest haplessly through days of study for the final exam, but Ernest proves hopeless, though his friends continue to help him. On the day of the big exam, Ernest is about to go in, but before he does, the scientists return and tell him excitedly that the brain accelerator has been repaired. Feeling for his friends who labored with him all that time, he declines to use the machine and takes the exam on his own.

Later, the football game finals for the district championship take place. During the game, the board inspector, who personally wants the merger to happen, bribes the football coach into purposely losing the game against the rival team. As a school board member is in the audience, the forthcoming loss will likely convince the board the merger must happen. The coach accepts, resulting in the football team losing every play. Meanwhile, Ernest is still in charge in the marching band. Using his own ideas, he comes up with small routines during the halftime show. On the other hand, other members of the band are informed of the fix on the game and sneak off. With the help of the two science teachers, they infiltrate the locker room with sleeping gas, effectively replacing the football team to win the game themselves. During the game between the rival team and the replacements, the two scientists reveal to Ernest their new brain accelerator. He immediately charges up and becomes the coach for the team. With his new intelligent strategies, the tide turns and they start winning. However, in the last play of the game, Ernest forgets to recharge and loses his intelligence while in play. He ends up rolling down field on a drum after the ball that was thrown and flies into the end zone, catching it. The team wins just as the football players arrive from the locker room in bewilderment and the board trustee is informed of the inspector's actions and intentions and the coach's involvement.

In the end, due to the victory at the football game, the school stays open and both the coach and the inspector get fired. It is also revealed Ernest passed the final exam, so he earns his high school diploma and is permitted to keep his job.

Cast

Home media

References

External links
 
 
 The Cincinnati Enquirer 

1994 films
1994 comedy films
Canadian comedy films
Ernest P. Worrell films
Films shot in Vancouver
1990s high school films
American comedy films
1994 directorial debut films
1990s English-language films
1990s American films
1990s Canadian films